Kwon Hyuk is a South Korean actor and model. He is known for his roles in dramas such as Top Star U-back, Graceful Friends and A Good Supper. He also appeared in the movie The Point Men.

Biography and career
He was born on February 19, 1989, in South Korea. In 2018 he joined Studio & News, he first did modeling for various promotional videos of Hyundai Sonata N Line, Samsung QLED, Samsung Fire & Marine Insurance, Korea Centers for Disease Control and Prevention, SMEG Brand Film and KDB Development Bank, KT Membership Shopping Discount, KT Galaxy Note 9, HUG Housing City Fund. The very same year he made his debut as an actor in drama Top Star U-back and appeared in music video "Winter-Somebody's tale". In 2020 he appeared in drama Graceful Friends also starring in the movie The Point Men. In 2021, he landed his first main role in a television series in the MBC drama A Good Supper, appearing alongside Jae Hee, Jung Woo-yeon and Kang Da-hyun.

Filmography

Film

Television series

Web series

Music video

Awards and nominations

References

External links
 
 

1989 births
Living people
21st-century South Korean male actors
South Korean male models
South Korean male television actors
South Korean male film actors

IG https://www.instagram.com/kwonnhyukk/